Thanjavur Radhakrishnan Ramachandran (T.R.Ramanna) (1923–1997) was an Indian film director and producer.

Film career

Ramanna started his life as a sound recordist in a city studio and then made his way to film direction. He started the production company R.R. Pictures (with the initials of his sister and himself). He produced movies in Tamil, Telugu and Hindi, many of which were successful.

One of his successful film was Manapandhal, inspired by the Hollywood classic Sabrina (1954), directed by Billy Wilder and starring Humphrey Bogart, William Holden and Audrey Hepburn.

Filmography

References

External links
 

1997 deaths
Kannada film directors
Tamil film directors
20th-century Indian film directors
People from Thanjavur
Film directors from Tamil Nadu
Tamil-language film directors
Hindi-language film directors
Film producers from Tamil Nadu
1923 births